The Sultanate of Yogyakarta is a Javanese monarchy in Yogyakarta Special Region, in the Republic of Indonesia. The current head of the Sultanate is Hamengkubuwono X.

Yogyakarta existed as a state since 1755 on the territory of modern Indonesia in the central part of Java Island. The Sultanate became the main theatre of military operations during the Java War of 1825–1830, following which a significant part of its territory was annexed by the Dutch, and the degree of autonomy was significantly curtailed. In 1946–1948, during the war of independence of Indonesia, the capital of the republic was transferred to the territory of the sultanate, in the city of Yogyakarta.

In 1950, Yogyakarta, along with the Principality of Pakualaman became part of Indonesia, with the former royal realms united as a Special Region, with equal status to that of a national province. At the same time, the hereditary title of Sultan of Yogyakarta & the Prince of Pakualaman, with ceremonial privileges carried with the titles, were legally secured for the rulers. On 2012, the Indonesian Government formally recognised the reigning Sultan of Yogyakarta as the hereditary Governor of Special Region of Yogyakarta, with the Pakualam Prince as its hereditary Vice Governor (article 18 paragraph 1c). The Sultanate is claimed to own almost 10% of land in the Special Region of Yogyakarta.

Geography 
The sultanate is located on the southern coast of the island of Java. In the south it is bordered by the Indian Ocean, with land surrounded by the province of Central Java. The area is 3,133 km², while the population in 2010 was about three and a half million people. The special district of Yogyakarta, along with Jakarta, has the largest population density among the provinces of Indonesia.

Not far from the city of Yogyakarta is the volcano Merapi, the most active volcano in Indonesia which has erupted regularly since 1548, resulting in great damage to the population of the district. In October–November 2010, there was a strong volcanic eruption, forcing about a hundred thousand people to temporarily leave their homes.

History
After Sultan Agung, the Sultanate of Mataram was declining due to a power struggle within the sultanate itself. To make things worse, the Dutch East India Company exploited the power struggle to increase its control. At the peak of the conflict, the Mataram Sultanate was split in two based on the Treaty of Giyanti of 13 February 1755: Yogyakarta Sultanate and Surakarta Sunanate.

The Giyanti Treaty mentioned Pangeran Mangkubumi as Sultan of Yogyakarta with the title of:

Translates as:

As the result of further colonial intervention within the ruling family of the former Mataram Sultanate, the area which today is Special Region of Yogyakarta was divided into the Sultanate of Yogyakarta (Kasultanan Yogyakarta) and the Principality of Pakualam (Kadipaten Pakualaman).

The Dutch Colonial Government arranged for the carrying out autonomous self-government, arranged under a political contract. When the Indonesian independence was proclaimed, the rulers, the Sultan of Yogyakarta and Prince of Pakualaman made a declaration supporting the newly founded Republic of Indonesia, and they would unite with the Republic. After the republic's independence is formally recognised by International public, the former royal realms were formally unified on 3 August 1950 into the Yogyakarta Special Region, with the Sultan of Yogyakarta became the hereditary Governor of Yogyakarta Special Region & the Prince of Pakualaman become its hereditary Vice Governor of Yogyakarta Special Region, formally on 30 August 2012 (article 18 paragraph 1c); both were responsible to the President of Indonesia.

In carrying out the local government administration it considers three principles: decentralisation, concentration and assistance. The provincial government carries out the responsibilities and authorities of the central government, while on other hand carrying out its autonomous responsibilities and authorities. The Regional Government consists of the Head of the Region and the Legislative Assembly of the Region. Such construction guarantees good co-operation between the Head of Region and the Legislative Assembly of Region to achieve a sound regional government administration. The Head of the Special Region of Yogyakarta has got responsibility as the Head of the Territory and titled as a Governor.

The first Governor was the late Hamengkubuwono IX, Sultan of Yogyakarta and continued by Paku Alam VIII as acting governor until Hamengkubuwono X ascended in 1998. Unlike the other heads of regions in Indonesia, the governor of the Special Region of Yogyakarta has the privilege or special status of not being bound to the period of position nor the requirements and way of appointment (article 25 paragraph 1 & 2). However, in carrying out their duties, they have the same authority and responsibilities.

On 5 May 2015, following a Royal Decree issued by the Sultan, Princess Mangkubumi (previously known as Princess Pembayun) received the new name Mangkubumi Hamemayu Hayuning Bawana Langgeng ing Mataram. This denotes her as the heiress presumptive to the Sultanate. The title Mangkubumi was formerly reserved for senior male princes groomed for the throne, including the reigning Sultan. The decree thus admits female royals into the line of succession for the first time since the founding of the Sultanate. According to the current Sultan, this was in line with his prerogatives; his action was nonetheless criticised by more conservative male family members such as his siblings, who were thus displaced in the line of succession.

Residences

The principal residence of the sultan is the kraton (palace), sometimes called the keraton but otherwise known in formal terms Keraton Ngayogyakarta Hadiningrat.

List of Sultans 
List of sultans of Yogyakarta:

See also

List of Sunni Muslim dynasties
Hamengkubuwono, including list of sultans
List of monarchs of Java
Kraton Yogyakarta

Notes

Further reading

References

External links 

 
Precolonial states of Indonesia
Sultanates
States and territories established in 1755
Islamic states in Indonesia
History of Java
Monarchies of Asia